Martin Bouz (born November 3, 1979) is a Czech former professional ice hockey forward.

Bouz played six gamed for HC Oceláři Třinec during the 2004–05 Czech Extraliga season, scoring one goal. He also played in the English Premier Ice Hockey League for the Guildford Flames and the Polska Hokej Liga for Naprzód Janów and TKH Toruń.

References

External links

1979 births
Living people
Czech ice hockey forwards
HK Dukla Michalovce players
Guildford Flames players
HC Havířov players
BK Havlíčkův Brod players
SK Horácká Slavia Třebíč players
Naprzód Janów players
HC Oceláři Třinec players
HC Olomouc players
IHC Písek players
TKH Toruń players
Czech expatriate ice hockey players in Slovakia
Czech expatriate sportspeople in England
Czech expatriate sportspeople in Austria
Czech expatriate sportspeople in Poland
Expatriate ice hockey players in Poland
Expatriate ice hockey players in England
Expatriate ice hockey players in Austria